Serruria bolusii, the Agulhas spiderhead, is a flower-bearing shrub that belongs to the genus Serruria and forms part of the fynbos. The plant is native to the Western Cape and is found in Elim hills and Soetanysberg. The shrub grows upright to 1.0 m tall and flowers from August to December.

The plant dies after a fire but the seeds survive. Two months after flowering, the fruit falls off. The plant is unisexual. Pollination takes place through the action of insects. The plant grows in sandy soil at altitudes of 20 – 580 m.

References 

 http://redlist.sanbi.org/species.php?species=807-17
 http://biodiversityexplorer.info/plants/proteaceae/serruria_bolusii.htm
 https://www.proteaatlas.org.za/Protea_Atlas_Serruria1.pdf bl. 17

bolusii
Flora of the Cape Provinces
Plants described in 1912